Poppleton is the main character in a series of children's books written by American author Cynthia Rylant.  The stories follow a pig named Poppleton who moves from the city to a small town and enjoys humorous adventures with his friends and neighbors. This series is marketed to children ages 5 to 9. Poppleton was the mascot for American Library Association's 1997 reading campaign.

Characters 
 Poppleton - A pig who has recently moved to the country from the city
 Cherry Sue- A llama who lives next door to Poppleton and appears more frequently than any other minor character
 Filmore- A goat who is Poppleton's neighbor.
 Hudson- A mouse that is living close by to Poppleton.
 Zacko- A ferret who is Poppleton's friend and works at a coat store.
 Marsha- Poppleton's friend who works at a bike store.
 Gus- A turtle who is the mail carrier
 Patrick- A finch who inadvertently knocked down Poppleton's icicles. Poppleton was gravely dismayed but Patrick had the ingenious idea to build something with the icicles. After all their hard work, they enjoyed a candlelit dinner together.

Books in the series 
All published by Blue Sky Press.
 Poppleton (1997). .
 Poppleton And Friends (1997). .
 Poppleton Everyday (1998). .
 Poppleton Forever (1998). .
 Poppleton In Fall (1999). .
 Poppleton In Spring (1999). .
 Poppleton Has Fun (2000). . 
 Poppleton In Winter (2001). .

External links 
 Cynthia Rylant: Official website

References

American children's book series
Blue Sky Press books